Henri Désiré Landru (1869–1922) was a French serial killer.
 
Landru may also refer to:

 Landru (film), a 1963 French film about the serial killer
 Landrú, byline of Argentine political cartoonist Juan Carlos Colombres (1923–2017)
 Landru, a character in the Star Trek episode "The Return of the Archons"